Slayer was an American thrash metal band. 

Slayer may also refer to:

People
 Justin Slayer, an American pornographic film actor and director
 SlayerS_`BoxeR`, in-game name of StarCraft player Lim Yo-hwan

Film and TV
 The Slayer, a 1982 horror film
 Slayer (film), a 2006 film
 Slayers (film), an upcoming American horror film
 Slayer (Buffy the Vampire Slayer), a type of female character, charged with fighting vampires and demons, in the TV series and franchise Buffy the Vampire Slayer

Books and comics
 Slayers,  a Japanese fantasy light novel and media franchise
 Slayer, a character in The Wheel of Time

Games
 Slayer (video game), a horizontally scrolling shooter game released in 1988
 Slayer (Guilty Gear), a video game character from the fighting game series Guilty Gear
 Slayer, a character class or skill in various role-playing games
 Advanced Dungeons & Dragons: Slayer, a 1994 role-playing video game for the 3DO
 Slayers (video game), a video game based on the Slayers light novel series
 Lina the Slayer, a heroine in the video game Dota 2

Music
 S.A. Slayer, formerly Slayer, an American heavy metal band
 "Slayers", a 1998 song from the Vampires film soundtrack
 "Slayers", a 2009 song from the Gamer film soundtrack

Other uses
 Slayer, term for a murderer
 Slayer rule, a doctrine prohibiting a murderer to inherit from the victim
 Washington D.C. Slayers, an American rugby league team

See also
 Slay (disambiguation)
 S-layer